Horní Pěna is a municipality and village in Jindřichův Hradec District in the South Bohemian Region of the Czech Republic. It has about 600 inhabitants. The village of Malíkov nad Nežárkou within the municipality is well preserved and is protected by law as a village monument zone.

Administrative parts
The village of Malíkov nad Nežárkou is an administrative part of Horní Pěna.

Geography
It lies in the Javořice Highlands.

History
The first written mention of Horní Pěna is from 1354.

Sights

References

External links

Villages in Jindřichův Hradec District